Cobalt blue is a type of color pigment. Additionally, it may refer to:

Animals
Cobalt blue tarantula, a type of tarantula
Cobalt Blue Mbuna or Cobalt Blue African Cichlid, a type of fish
Cobalt Blue (horse), winner of the 2007 San Felipe Stakes

Fiction
Cobalt Blue (comics), a comic book character appearing in books published by DC Comics
Cobalt Blue (novel), a 2013 Indian novel by Sachin Kundalkar
Cobalt Blue (film), a 2022 Netflix adaptation of the Kundalkar novel

Other uses
Cobalt blue (RAL), a RAL color
Cobalt Blue (album), 1992 album of ambient electric guitar music by Michael Brook
Cobalt blue glass, a type of glass